Ólafur Eðvarð Rafnsson (7 April 1963 - 19 June 2013) was the president of FIBA Europe from 2010 until 2013. He also served president of the Icelandic Basketball Association from 1996 until 2006 when he was voted as the president of the National Olympic and Sports Association of Iceland where he served until 2013.

Basketball career

Club
Ólafur played 109 games in the Icelandic Úrvalsdeild karla from 1983 until 1989, averaging 9.7 points per game. He won the Icelandic championship with Haukar in 1988 and the Icelandic cup in 1985 and 1986.

National team
Ólafur played 7 games for the Icelandic national team between 1985 and 1986.

Personal life
Ólafur is the father of Icelandic women's national basketball team players Auður Íris Ólafsdóttir and Sigrún Björg Ólafsdóttir.

Death
Ólafur died, at the age of 50, during a visit to Geneva, Switzerland, where he had been attending the official opening of FIBA's new headquarters.

References

1963 births
2013 deaths
Basketball executives
Ólafur Rafnsson
Ólafur Rafnsson
Ólafur Rafnsson
Ólafur Rafnsson
Ólafur Rafnsson
Ólafur Rafnsson